Kuliga is a rural locality (a village) in Osinovskoye Rural Settlement of Vinogradovsky District, Arkhangelsk Oblast, Russia. The population was 10 as of 2010.

Geography 
Kuliga is located 32 km southeast of Bereznik (the district's administrative centre) by road. Konetsgorye is the nearest rural locality.

References 

Rural localities in Vinogradovsky District